Rumis (also Romanized as Rūmīs; also known as Romeys, Romeyẕ, Romīs, and Romīş) is a village in Moshrageh Rural District, Moshrageh District, Ramshir County, Khuzestan Province, Iran. At the 2006 census, its population was 421, in 84 families.

References 

Populated places in Ramshir County